Pico de São Tomé is the highest mountain in São Tomé and Príncipe at  elevation. It lies just west of the centre of São Tomé Island, in the Parque Natural Obô de São Tomé and in the Lembá District. The second highest point, Pico de Ana Chaves, lies about 3 km to its south east. The town Santa Catarina is 8 km to the west.

Description
It formed along the Cameroon line, a linear rift zone extending from Cameroon southwest into the Atlantic Ocean. Most of the lava erupted on São Tomé over the last million years has been basalt. The most recent activity was about 36,000 years ago.

On old maps of São Tomé and Príncipe, the mountain is named "Pico Gago Coutinho", after Portuguese naval officer Carlos Viegas Gago Coutinho (1869–1959) who, together with Sacadura Cabral (1881–1924), was the first to cross the South Atlantic Ocean by air.

The mountain is clad in forest. On the lower slopes are plantations of coffee and cocoa, and higher up are large trees swathed in orchids, lichens and other epiphytes. The upper parts of the mountain are often swathed in mist. It can be climbed from two sides. The summit can then be reached in about an hour before descending via Carvalho to the Bombaim Plantation house. The other route ascends from the botanic garden at Bom Sucesso to Carvalho where there is a rest area and camping facilities. On the next day, the summit can be reached with a descent being made to Ponta Figo. The ascent can be made in a single eighteen hour hike from Ponta Figo, but this does not allow much time for viewing the flora and fauna. The trek is not difficult but the often rainy weather tends to make the path very slippery.

See also
 List of mountains in São Tomé and Príncipe
 List of Ultras of Africa

References 

Volcanoes of São Tomé and Príncipe
Polygenetic shield volcanoes
Lembá District
Sao Tome
Highest points of countries